The Platz des 18. März is a public square in Berlin-Mitte located immediately west of the Brandenburg Gate, opposite Pariser Platz, at the junction of Ebertstraße and Straße des 17. Juni.

History 

During the Cold War, the border between East and West Berlin ran straight through the square. The eastern and western parts of the square were separated by a semicircular arch of the Berlin Wall from 1961 until its fall in 1989. Ronald Reagan's 1987 "Tear down this wall!" speech was held at the square in front of the Brandenburg Gate, and a memorial plaque was placed there in his honour 25 years later.

Name 

The square was formerly named  from the eighteenth century. In 1934 it was renamed  after Paul von Hindenburg, then the recently deceased President of Germany, but the change was reverted in 1958. It was changed to the present name on 15 June 2000 after long discussions between the Senate and boroughs of Berlin.

18 March was a significant date twice in German history: In the course of the German revolutions of 1848–1849, the Prussian Army attacked revolutionaries in Berlin on 18 March 1848. The only democratic elections of East Germany were held on 18 March 1990.

References 

Squares in Berlin
Mitte